The 2018 World Junior Table Tennis Championships were held in Bendigo, Australia from 2 to 9 December, 2018.

China completed a clean sweep of gold medals in all seven events, with Xu Haidong winning the boys' singles title and Qian Tianyi securing victory in the girls' singles.

Medal summary

Events

Medal table

See also
2018 World Team Table Tennis Championships
2018 ITTF World Tour

References

External links
2018 World Junior Table Tennis Championships

World Junior Table Tennis Championships
World Junior Table Tennis Championships
World Junior Table Tennis Championships
World Junior Table Tennis Championships
Table tennis competitions in Australia
International sports competitions hosted by Australia
Sport in Bendigo
World Junior Table Tennis Championships